Peko-Wallsend was an Australian mining company.

History
Peko-Wallsend was founded in 1961 when Peko Mines merged with Wallsend Investments. In 1962 Peko-Wallsend purchased Toll Transport. In January 1968, Peko-Wallsend acquired a majority shareholding in the Mount Morgan Mine.

In May 1979, Sims Metal was acquired. In December 1979, Peko-Wallsend acquired a 25% stake in the Ranger Uranium Mine.

In 1986, Toll Transport was sold in a management buyout to Paul Little and Peter Rowsthorn. In 1988 Peko Wallsend was taken over by North Limited.

References

Mining companies of Australia
Non-renewable resource companies established in 1961
Non-renewable resource companies disestablished in 1988
1961 establishments in Australia
1988 disestablishments in Australia